The University of Ulsan (UOU) was founded on February 19, 1969 as the Ulsan Institute of Technology. The University was promoted to a full-fledged University on March 1, 1985. The university is located in Mugeo-dong, Ulsan, South Korea. The University currently has approximately 10,500 students enrolled.

The city of Ulsan has been recognized as the Korean city which was built around the corporate base of the multinational Hyundai conglomerate.  Thus, the Hyundai Conglomerate announced its plan to give 40 billion won to assist a variety of university-industry cooperation projects.

Academics 
Even though it started as Ulsan Institute of Technology, University of Ulsan today offers programs in broad area through 12 colleges. There are 6 different graduate schools including the general Graduate School which offers Master's degrees in 29 different disciplines and Doctorate degrees in 19 different areas of study. In 2007, 12,614 undergraduate students and 1,637 graduate students are enrolled in the university.

Colleges (Undergraduate) 

 College of Humanities 
 College of Social Sciences
 College of Business Administration
 College of Natural Sciences
 College of Human Ecology
 College of Engineering
 College of Architecture
 College of Music
 College of Fine Arts
 College of Design
 College of Medicine
 College of Industry and Management

Graduate Schools 

 The Graduate School
 Graduate School of Business
 Graduate School of Public Policy 
 Social Welfare 
 Public Policy 
 Graduate School of Industry
 Energy Management Engineering 
 Industrial Management Engineering     
 Environmental Engineering 
 Construction Engineering              
 Architecture ＆Urban Studies 
 Sports Management                     
 Smart IT Convergence Engineering 
 Clinical Nursing                      
 International Business English 
 Graduate School of Education 
 Educational Administration            
 Counselor Education 
 Korean Language Education             
 English Language Education 
 Japanese Language Education           
 Chinese Language Education 
 History Education                     
 Museum & Arts Education 
 Ethics Education                      
 Social Science Education 
 Early Childhood Education             
 Mathematics Education 
 Physical Education                    
 Chemistry Education 
 Biology Education                      
 Physical Education 
 Home Economics Education              
 Computer Education 
 Nutrition Education 
 Institute of e-Vehicle Technology (was created in 2004 with the support of city of Ulsan and the Korean government.) 
 Vehicle Design
 Vehicle Manufacturing
 IT/Mechatronics

World rankings

Research Institutes 
A majority of colleges at the University of Ulsan have individual research institutes. The aim of these institutes is to promote research into various academic fields and to publish relevant findings resulting from these investigations. The research institutes provide a link for cooperation between the university, the industry, and the private and public sectors. The University of Ulsan has 15 research institutes.

Presidents 
Dr. Kwan Lee, March 1, 1985 - March 15, 1988
Dr. Sang-Ju Lee, March 16, 1988 - February 28, 1996
Dr. Bon-Ho Koo, March 1, 1996 - March 9, 2000
Dr. Moo-Ki Bai, March 10, 2000 - June 30, 2003
Dr. Chung-Kil Chung, July 1, 2003  - June 23, 2008
Dr. Do-Yeon Kim, September 10, 2008 - March 10, 2011 
Dr. Cheol Lee, March 11, 2011 – February 28, 2015
Dr. Yeon-Cheon Oh, March 1, 2015 – Present

References

 
Nam District, Ulsan
Hyundai Heavy Industries Group
Educational institutions established in 1970
1970 establishments in South Korea